Murua Rural LLG is a local-level government (LLG) of Milne Bay Province, Papua New Guinea.

Wards
01. Kulumadau
02. Guasopa
03. Wabununa
04. Kavatana
05. Kaurai
06. Iwa
07. Unumatana
08. Budibudi
09. Yanaba
10. Gawa Island
11. Kauwai
12. Madau
13. Dikoias
14. Kwaiwata
15. Muneiveyova
16. Oyavata
17. Alcester

References

Local-level governments of Milne Bay Province